Rear Admiral Morton Claire Mumma, Jr. (24 August 1904 – 14 August 1968) was a senior officer in the United States Navy. He was awarded the Navy Cross for actions on 13 December 1941 while commanding  during World War II. He later served as naval aide to Secretary James Forrestal in 1944–45, and retired in 1946. Mumma was president of the National Rifle Association from 1955 to 1957, and at his death was on the association's executive council.

Early life
Morton C. Mumma, Jr., was born on 24 August 1904 in Manila, Philippines. He was the eldest son of Colonel Morton C. Mumma, United States Army. He attended schools in Iowa City, Iowa. Appointed to the United States Naval Academy in 1921, he graduated in the class of 1925. Colonel Mumma was noted as "expert rifle shot," and he passed his skills to his son. Mumma, Jr., was captain of the academy rifle team, and coach of the academy rifle team twice, from 1928 to 1929, and from 1938 to 1940. Upon graduation, he joined the Navy service-wide rifle team.

Prior to attending submarine school at Groton, Connecticut in 1928, Mumma served in destroyers. One of his first commands was the submarine  from 1935 until 1938. Originally based at Pearl Harbor, the submarine relocated to Coco Solo, in the Panama Canal Zone, in 1936.

World War II
He was awarded the Navy Cross for actions on 13 December 1941 during World War II, while serving aboard , after making contact with two Japanese destroyers, and bravely began a submerged attack; the destroyers detected her, dropping a couple of depth charges, while Sailfish fired two torpedoes. Despite a large explosion nearby, no damage was done, and the destroyers counterattacked with 18–20 depth charges. The depth charging led Mumma to suffer a breakdown and he was relieved.

Navy Cross Citation
The President of the United States of America takes pleasure in presenting the Navy Cross to Lieutenant Commander Morton Claire Mumma, Jr., United States Navy, for extraordinary heroism in the line of his profession as Commanding Officer of the U.S.S. SAILFISH (SS-192), on the FIRST War Patrol of that submarine in enemy controlled waters of off Luzon, Philippine Islands. On the night of 13 December 1941, the ship made contact with a convoy escorted by three Japanese destroyers. Lieutenant Commander Mumma boldly maneuvered his submarine into striking position despite enemy depth charge counter measures and directed operations and fire to score a torpedo hit on an enemy destroyer. Through his experience and sound judgment Lieutenant Commander Mumma brought his ship safely back to port. His conduct throughout was an inspiration to his officers and men and in keeping with the highest traditions of the United States Naval Service.

Patrol boat service

Following duty with the Southwest Pacific submarine staff, and then as naval liaison to Fifth Air Force, on 5 February 1943 Mumma became Commander, Task Group 50.1, the PT boats in the Southwest Pacific. On 15 March, with the creation the US Seventh Fleet, Task Group 50.1 became Task Group 70.1, Motor Torpedo Boat Squadrons Seventh Fleet. Mumma "was responsible directly to, and only to, the Commander Seventh Fleet. Furthermore, from the start he had full operational control of his boats, and specific areas were assigned for PT operations. As a task group commander he received complete information as to the movements of other naval vessels." Mumma's headquarters were at Milne Bay, Papua New Guinea.

In early March 1943, Mumma's PT boats, leaving from Tufi, Papua New Guinea, took part in the Battle of the Bismarck Sea. Late 3 March, Mumma's boats sank the Oigawa Maru (6,493 tons). In April, Mumma moved his advance base from Tufi to Morobe, Papua New Guinea.

Nassau Bay, southeast of Salamaua, was captured at Mumma's suggestion that a supply base there would shorten the supply line to the 3rd Australian Division. Mumma's PT boats were used for the first time as troop carriers, carrying 70 soldiers in addition to the crew.

Mumma's PT boats continued their raiding actions in support of the New Guinea campaign. In December 1943, Mumma received this letter from Australian General Frank H. Berryman:

<div style="background:#efefef;margin:1em 3em;border:1px solid darkgrey;">
<div style="margin-right:2em;">
H.Q. 2 AUST CORPS, 1 Dec. 43.
Commander M. C. MUMMA USN,
<blockquote>Comd MTB Squadrons, Seventh Fleet, US NAVY</div>
—F. H. BERRYMAN,Maj-Gen, Comd 2 Aust Corps.</div>

On 8 February 1944, Mumma was relieved as Commander Motor Torpedo Boat Squadrons Seventh Fleet and Commander Task Group 70.1 For his service, Commander Mumma was awarded a
Legion of Merit with a gold star in lieu of a second Legion of Merit.

Later life
During 1944 and 1945, Mumma was the naval aide to the US Secretary of the Navy, James Forrestal. Mumma's picture (top) shows him wearing the 4-loop blue and gold aiguilette as the aide to the last cabinet-level Secretary of the Navy. Mumma's time as aide was the last year of World War II; Forrestal was concerned with war termination and Navy demobilization.

Leaving duty as Forrestal's aide, Mumma assumed responsibilities as the Planning Control Director of the Bureau of Naval Personnel. He retired from active duty in 1946, only to be recalled for the Korean War. His last military assignment was as the Chief Planning Officer for the Selective Service System from 1951 to 1953.

From 1955 to 1957, Admiral Mumma was president of the National Rifle Association, and until his death was a member of the association's executive council. Continuing his interest in rifle marksmanship, Mumma was a long-time member of the National Board for the Promotion of Rifle Practice. Like his father had (in 1904), Mumma earned NBPRP Distinguished Marksman in 1927.

Rear Admiral Mumma died of cancer in 1968 at his home (3667 East Baker Street) in Tucson, Arizona.

Legacy
Mort Bay, 15 miles north of Morobe, Papua New Guinea, was named by Australian hydrographers in Commander Mumma's honor. Mort Bay was the point of departure for the landing at Nassau Bay, 29 June 1943.The Mumma Trophy'' is presented to the national champion rifle marksman by the National Rifle Association. The trophy, a large silver urn on a wooden pedestal, is inscribed:

Awards
Submarine Combat Patrol insignia
Submarine Qualification Insignia
Navy Cross
Legion of Merit with gold star
World War I Victory Medal
American Defense Service Medal with "FLEET" clasp
American Campaign Medal
Asiatic–Pacific Campaign Medal
World War II Victory Medal
National Defense Service Medal
Navy Expert Rifleman Medal
Navy Expert Pistol Shot Medal

Notes

References

Recipients of the Navy Cross (United States)
1904 births
1968 deaths
United States Naval Academy alumni
United States Navy admirals
United States Distinguished Marksman
United States Navy personnel of World War II
Honorary Officers of the Order of the British Empire
Presidents of the National Rifle Association
Recipients of the Legion of Merit